RICP may refer to:

 Raised intracranial pressure
 Research Institute of Crop Production, Czech Republic
 Return of Indigenous Cultural Property, i.e. Repatriation (cultural heritage)
 Rhode Island Capitol Police, United States